Streicher is a German surname. Notable people with the surname include:

 Streicher's, police equipment and supply company founded in 1953 in Butler, Wisconsin
 Agatha Streicher (1520 – 1581), German physician
 Herbert Streicher, also known as Harry Reems, a pornographic actor
 Johann Andreas Streicher (1761, Stuttgart – 1833, Vienna), German pianist, composer and piano maker
 Nannette Streicher, née Stein (1769, Augsburg – 1833, Vienna), German piano maker, composer and music educator.
 Johann Baptist Streicher (1796, Vienna – 1871, Vienna), Austrian piano maker
 Julius Streicher (1885–1946), prominent Nazi prior to World War II, founder and publisher of anti-Semitic Der Stürmer newspaper, executed for war crimes
 Ludwig Streicher (1920–2003), contrabassist from Vienna, Austria. 
 Michael A. Streicher (1921–2006), American metallurgist and engineer who became internationally recognized
 Mike Streicher (born in Findlay, Ohio), American auto racing driver

German-language surnames